Ebenezer Cooke or Cook may refer to:

 Ebenezer Cooke (poet) (1667–1732), sometimes spelled Cook, London-born American poet
 Ebenezer Cooke, a fictional version of the poet who is the protagonist of John Barth's 1960 novel The Sot-Weed Factor
 Ebenezer Cooke (politician) (1832–1907), Australian accountant and parliamentarian
 Ebenezer Cooke (art education reformer) (1853–1904), art master and art education pioneer

See also
 Ebenezer Wake Cook (1843–1926), Australian painter
 Ebenezer (given name)